Tikolo is a Kenyan surname.

Notable people
Notable people with this surname include:
 David Tikolo (born 1964), Kenyan cricketer
 Steve Tikolo (born 1971), Kenyan cricketer
 Tom Tikolo (born 1961), Kenyan cricketer
Keith Tikolo  (born 1992) Kenyan businessman and philanthropist